The Straits Times Index (abbreviation: STI) is a capitalisation-weighted measurement stock market index that is regarded as the benchmark index for the stock market in Singapore. It tracks the performance of the top 30 companies that are listed on the Singapore Exchange (SGX). 

The STI is jointly calculated by the SGX, the SPH Media Trust and the FTSE Group.

History

Early years
The STI has a history dating back to its founding in 1966. Following a major sectoral re-classification of listed companies by the Singapore Exchange, which saw the removal of the "industrials" category, the STI replaced the previous Straits Times Industrials Index (abbreviation: STII) and began trading on 31 August 1998 at 885.26 points, in continuation of where the STII left off. At the time, it represented 78% of the average daily traded value over a 12-month period and 61.2% of total market capitalisation on the exchange. 

The STI was constructed by SPH, the Singapore Exchange and SPH's consultant, Professor Tse Yiu Kuen from the Singapore Management University (formerly from the National University of Singapore). It came under formal review at least once annually and was also reviewed on an ad hoc basis when necessary. One such review, for instance, raised the number of stocks from 45 to 50, which took effect when trading resumed on 18 March 2005. This change reduced the index representation of the average daily traded value to 60%, while increasing its total market capitalisation to 75%.

Revamp
The STI was again revamped and relaunched on 10 January 2008. As part of a new partnership between SPH, SGX and FTSE, the number of constituent stocks was reduced from about 50 to 30 and the index was re-calculated using FTSE's methodology. Besides the STI, the partners also developed a family of indices including the FTSE ST Dividend Index, FTSE ST China Top tradable index, FTSE ST Catalist Index and FTSE ST Maritime Index as well as 19 Supersector and 39 Sector indices. For the purposes of computing the indices, stocks are classified using the Industry Classification Benchmark (ICB).

The family tree of the FTSE ST Index Series:

 FTSE ST All-Share Index
 Straits Times Index
 FTSE ST Mid Cap Index
 FTSE ST Small Cap Index
 FTSE ST China Index
 FTSE ST China Top Index
 FTSE ST Maritime Index
 FTSE ST All-Share Industry Indices (10)
 FTSE ST All-Share Supersector Indices (19)
 FTSE ST All-Share Sector Indices (39)
 FTSE ST Real Estate Index
 FTSE ST Real Estate Investment & Services Index
 FTSE ST Real Estate Investment Trusts Index
 FTSE ST Fledgling Index

The creation of the FTSE ST Index Series was intended to facilitate the creation of financial products such as institutional and retail funds, exchange-traded funds (ETFs), derivatives contracts and other index-linked products. There are currently two ETFs listed on the SGX that track the STI: the SPDR Straits Times Index ETF (formerly known as the streetTRACKS Straits Times Index Fund)(managed by State Street Global Advisors) and the Nikko AM's Singapore STI ETF.

Record values

Annual Returns 
The following table shows the annual development of the S&P/TSX Composite Index, which was calculated back to 1970.

Constituents 
The 30 constituents of the STI as of 3 January 2022 are:

References

External links
 Official website
 Reuters page for .FTSTI
 Bloomberg page for FSSTI:IND
 A detailed list of the STI index components with description of each company, logo and link to its website can be found on ASEAN UP Top 30 companies from Singapore’s STI
 Performance of STI index and its 30 components for the period of 1 week, 1 month, 3 months, YTD, 1 year, 3 years.

1966 establishments in Singapore
Singapore Exchange
Economy of Singapore
Asian stock market indices